Dalak may refer to:

 Dalak, Afghanistan, located in Bamyan
 Dalak, Iran, a village in Kurdistan Province, Iran
 Dalak people, an ethnic group found in western Afghanistan
 Count Dalak Kenola, a fictional character in Frank Herbert's Dune universe, father of Farad'n

See also 
 Dahlak Archipelago, an island group in the Red Sea
 Dalek, fictional aliens in the British television series Doctor Who